Elizabeth Morris "Lally" Graham Weymouth (born July 3, 1943) is an American journalist, and senior associate editor of The Washington Post. She was previously special diplomatic correspondent for Newsweek magazine during her family's ownership of the publication.

Early life and education
She is the eldest of the four children of Katharine Graham and Philip Graham, both of whom were publishers of The Post. Her maternal grandmother, Agnes Meyer, was a Lutheran of German ancestry. Her mother was baptised as a Lutheran but attended an Episcopal church while growing up. Her father, Philip (Phil) Leslie Graham, was born to a Lutheran family in Terry, South Dakota. The eldest of her three younger brothers is Donald E. Graham, who was the publisher of The Post from 1979 to 2000, a position held by Weymouth's daughter Katharine Weymouth from 2008 until 2014, the co-founder of Graham Holdings Company, which has Kaplan tutoring services and The Washington Post among its various subsidiaries.

Weymouth attended The Madeira School and graduated from Radcliffe College at Harvard University cum laude with a degree in American history and literature.

Career

From 1968 to 1969, Weymouth worked at the Bedford Stuyvesant Restoration Corporation.

Weymouth edited and compiled Thomas Jefferson: The Man, His World, His Influence (1973, G.P. Putnam), a collection which includes contributions from leading Jeffersonian scholars. She is the author of America in 1876, The Way We Were (1976, Random House). She worked as a freelance journalist and contributing editor from 1977 to 1983 for such publications as New York magazine, The New York Times Magazine, Esquire, Atlantic Monthly, and Parade. From 1983 to 1986 she was a contributing editor for the Los Angeles Times.

Weymouth presently serves as Senior Associate Editor of The Washington Post. She has been writing on foreign affairs and conducting exclusive interviews with foreign heads of state since 1986. She is well known for having secured hard-to-get exclusive interviews with heads of state. Among her most famous interviews are her 1984 interview with Saddam Hussein, which was the first interview he granted an American journalist; her 2002 interview with Colonel Muammar Gaddafi in his tent in the Libyan Desert; and her 2007 interview with Pakistan’s Prime Minister Benazir Bhutto two weeks before she was assassinated. She has also conducted exclusive interviews with Egyptian President Abdel Fatah al-Sissi and Hosni Mubarak; Jordan’s King Abdullah II; and Syria’s Presidents Hafez al-Assad and Bashar al-Assad. In 2022, she interviewed Ukraine’s President Volodymyr Zelensky just before the war broke out.

In June 2017, Lally Weymouth conducted the first foreign interview with South Korea's new President Moon Jae-in in Seoul to discuss the crisis in North Korea. In April, Lally Weymouth interviewed Italy's new Prime Minister Gentilioni to discuss the flow of refugees into that country. Jordan's King Abdullah II also granted Mrs. Weymouth an interview in April and he discussed the Islamic State and the future of Syria. In March 2017, she travelled to Estonia to interview President Kersti Kaljulaid about the threat from Russia. She then went to Lithuania, where she interviewed President Dailia Grybauskaite about the same topics. In January, Lally Weymouth interviewed Masoud Barzani, President of the Kurdistan Region of Iraq, about the battle for Mosul. In December 2016, Lally Weymouth travelled to Peru to conduct an interview with Peru's President Pedro Pablo Kuczynski. In September 2016, she interviewed Colombia's President Manuel Santos and Italy's former Prime Minister Matteo Renzi.

Taiwan's President Tsai Ing-wen gave Mrs. Weymouth her first interview after taking office in Taipei in July 2016. Brazil's president Michel Temer granted his first foreign interview to Lally Weymouth in June 2016. In November 2016, she travelled to Myanmar to interview Aung San Suu Kyi following her party's overwhelming victory in the country's elections. Lally Weymouth has spent significant time in the Middle East. Former Iraqi President Saddam Hussein granted her the first print interview he gave to an American journalist. She also interviewed Colonel Muammar Gaddafi in his tent in the Libyan desert. Both Syrian Presidents Hafez and Bashar Assad granted her exclusive interviews. Egyptian President Abdel Fatah al-Sissi has given three interviews to Lally Weymouth.  She has interviewed every Israeli Prime Minister since 1981, including Shimon Peres, Yitzhak Rabin, and, most recently, Benjamin Netanyahu. Lally Weymouth conducted the last interview with Pakistan's Benazir Bhutto before her assassination in December 2007.

Personal life
In 1963, she married architect Yann Weymouth They divorced in 1969. They had two daughters: Katharine Weymouth, publisher of the Washington Post from 2008 to 2013, and Pamela Alma Weymouth, a writer for Huffington Post.

Weymouth was portrayed in the 2017 film The Post by Alison Brie.

References

External links 

 
  by Leon Charney on The Leon Charney Report

Living people
American women journalists
American people of German descent
American people of German-Jewish descent
Graham family (newspapers)
Radcliffe College alumni
People from Washington, D.C.
Madeira School alumni
1943 births
Newmark family
21st-century American women